Abingdon Junction railway station was a junction station for the branch line to Abingdon. It was opened by the Abingdon Railway Company on 2 June 1856 along with the branch, and was subsequently closed and replaced by Radley railway station on 8 September 1873. Radley station was in a more convenient place for access. At the same time as the station's opening, the next station to the south, formerly known as Abingdon Road was renamed .

In 1837 the first Bill for a railway to Abingdon was laid before Parliament; it would have brought a direct line from Didcot to Oxford through the town. The House of Commons passed the Bill, but the Lords rejected it. The Bill for the Oxford line was revived in the following year, but so strong was the opposition of Mr. Duffield, Abingdon's M.P., that the proposed line was forced to by-pass Abingdon; it eventually opened on 12 June 1844 and ran no nearer to Abingdon than the village of Radley, some two miles to the east.

No proper road access to the station was provided and only modest passenger facilities were afforded consisting of two facing wooden platforms  with a small building constructed on the up main side and a run-around loop for branch services and connections with the main line.

Following the conversion of the branch to standard gauge in November 1872, works began to extend the line a further ¾ mile northwards alongside the main line to reach a new station at Radley where it terminated in a bay platform on the station's west side. The station building from Abingdon Junction was transported to Radley, where it was sited just south of the road bridge, most likely on the down side. It remained there until well into British Railways days and was used by gangers and platelayers. The remains of Abingdon Junction survived for several years before their demolition, so that the only trace of the station today is the widened formation to the west of the main line before the Abingdon branch curved away.

References

Sources

Disused railway stations in Oxfordshire
Railway stations in Great Britain opened in 1856
Railway stations in Great Britain closed in 1873